Glochidion bourdillonii is a species of plant in the family Phyllanthaceae. It is endemic to Kerala in India.

References

bourdillonii
Flora of Kerala
Vulnerable plants
Taxonomy articles created by Polbot